Vítězslav Nezval (26 May 1900 – 6 April 1958) was a Czech poet, writer and translator. He was one of the most prolific avant-garde Czech writers in the first half of the 20th century and a co-founder of the Surrealist movement in Czechoslovakia.

Biography
His father was a school teacher in the village of Biskoupky in Southern Moravia who often traveled to see art exhibitions and was also a musician who studied under the composer Leoš Janáček. At age eleven, Nezval was sent to the gymnasium in Třebíč, where he learned piano and to compose music. He began writing in his teenage years while he was still interested in music. He was said to have played an accordion while studying the stars. In 1918, he was drafted into the Austrian army, but quickly sent home when he became ill. After the first World War, Nezval moved to Prague and began studying philosophy at the Charles University, but he did not receive his degree because he failed to finish his thesis. During this time, he was enchanted by the bustling literary scene that was thriving in the cafés and on the streets of Prague.

Literary work
Vítězslav Nezval was a member of the avant-garde group of artists Devětsil (literally "nine forces", the Czech name of the Butterbur plant but to a Czech-speaker an obvious reference to the nine founding members of the group). Devětsil members were the most prolific Czech artists of their generation. In 1922, the Devetsil group included, but was not limited to, Vítězslav Nezval, Jindřich Štyrský, Jaroslav Seifert, Karel Teige, and Toyen (Marie Cerminová). Also associated with the group was the later founder of the Prague Linguistic School, Roman Jakobson. Like the proletarian group before it, Devětsil looked to France for inspiration for their avant-garde literature and their Marxist political ideology originating from Russia. Though the Czechoslovakian state was newly formed after World War I, the younger generation felt there was still room for improvement and that a radical solution was necessary to gain true liberation. Most of these intellectuals had a zest for revolution and professed their allegiance to Lenin. Though their philosopher-president, Thomas Masaryk, gave them the first real socially-minded democracy, Nezval and others in his group did not accept this regime as representative of their beliefs and goals. In their writings they expressed their preference for the Marxist-internationalist consciousness of class solidarity.

The first manifesto of Devětsil urged young, progressive artists to look deeper into ordinary objects for poetic quality. Skyscrapers, airplanes, mime and poster lettering were the new arts.

Nezval was also a founding figure of Poetism, a direction within Devětsil primarily theorized by Karel Teige. His output consists of a number of poetry collections, experimental plays and novels, memoirs, essays, and translations. Along with Karel Teige, Jindřich Štyrský, and Toyen, Nezval frequently traveled to Paris where he rubbed shoulders with the French surrealists. His close friendship with André Breton and Paul Éluard was instrumental in founding The Surrealist Group of Czechoslovakia in 1934.  It was one of the first surrealist groups outside France, and Nezval served as the editor of its journal Surrealismus.

In collaboration with Nezval on his book Abeceda ("alphabet"), the Devětsil dancer Milča Mayerová adopted particular poses to represent each of the letters. Nezval wrote this poem focusing on the forms, sounds, and functions of the alphabet. Teige used typography and photomontage to create lasting images of the moves which are now printed in many editions of the book.

Nezval's poem Sbohem a šáteček (Waving farewell; 1934) was set to music by the Czech composer Vítězslava Kaprálová in 1937, and was premiered in its orchestral version in 1940 by Rafael Kubelik.

Later life 
After the German occupation of Czechoslovakia he became involved in the underground anti-fascist resistance movement and was imprisoned in 1944.

After the liberation of Czechoslovakia Nezval received numerous recognitions and awards for his work.  He tried remain true to the ideals of Poetism and d reconcile them Socialist realism, which was the new state approved artistic doctrine.  He was active in politics and became head of the film department of the Ministry of Information. 

Nezval's health began to deteriorate after the beginning of the 1950s. On April 6, 1958, he died in Prague of acute pneumonia and subsequent heart failure. The first mourning ceremony at took place at the Rudolfinum and he received a state funeral on 10t of April. He was buried at the Vyšehrad Cemetery in Prague. His written estate was acquired by the archives of the National Literature Memorial.

See also

Edison (poem)

References

External links

 Extensive biography and works  
 Bohuš Balajka: Přehledné dějiny literatury II. Prague: Fortuna, 2005. 
 Reference – short biography
 Woman in the Plural 
 The Absolute Gravedigger  
  kapralova.org

1900 births
1958 deaths
People from Brno-Country District
People from the Margraviate of Moravia
Communist Party of Czechoslovakia members
Czech communists
Czech male poets
Czech male novelists
Czech male dramatists and playwrights
Czech translators
Czech surrealist writers
Czechoslovak writers
20th-century translators
20th-century Czech novelists
20th-century Czech poets
20th-century Czech dramatists and playwrights
Communist poets
Burials at Vyšehrad Cemetery
Charles University alumni